Mount Arthur is a mountain located at the Queen Reach arm of the Jervis Inlet within the Pacific Ranges of the Coast Mountains in British Columbia Canada.  The mountain was named during the 1860 survey by  who charted all of the area and named the mountain after Prince Arthur William Patrick who was the seventh son of Queen Victoria and Prince Albert of England.

Gallery

References

External links
 
CM_C2308 Fraser River to N.E.Pt. of Texada Island including Howe Sound and Jervis Inlet 'Annotated'  1863.02.16 1865.08

Arthur
Arthur
New Westminster Land District